Springtown (formerly, Confederate Corners) is an unincorporated community in Monterey County, California, United States.

History
Originally Springtown or Spring Town, the place was named Confederate Corners after some Southerners settled there in the late 1860s. The early settlement included a general store and a wagon-making factory.

In the 1960s, it was considered that the community should become a retirement community.

The place is the inspiration for the fictional small town "Rebel Corners" in John Steinbeck's novel The Wayward Bus.

Name change
In 2017 a local campaign was started to rename the area. The Monterey County Board of Supervisors voted in support of the name change.

In 2018, the U.S. Board on Geographic Names approved changing the name to Springtown in reference to Francis and John Spring who had moved in the 1800s to Monterey County from San Francisco. The name "Confederate Corners" was rarely used or known among locals, and the area had no signs displaying the name.

Government
At the county level, Springtown is represented on the Monterey County Board of Supervisors by Supervisor Jane Parker.

References

 https://geonames.usgs.gov/apex/f?p=138:3:0::NO:3:P3_FID,P3_TITLE:221451,Springtown

Unincorporated communities in Monterey County, California
Salinas Valley
Unincorporated communities in California